

International badminton events
 May 21 – 28: 2017 Sudirman Cup in  Gold Coast, Queensland
  defeated , 3–2 in matches played, to win their fourth Sudirman Cup title. 
 August 21 – 27: 2017 BWF World Championships in  Glasgow
 Singles:  Viktor Axelsen (m) /  Nozomi Okuhara (f)
 Doubles:  (Liu Cheng & Zhang Nan) (m) /  (Chen Qingchen & Jia Yifan) (f)
 Mixed:  (Tontowi Ahmad & Liliyana Natsir)
 September 10 – 17: 2017 BWF World Senior Championships in  Kochi
 For results, click here.
 October 9 – 22: 2017 BWF World Junior Championships in  Yogyakarta
 Singles:  Kunlavut Vitidsarn (m) /  Gregoria Mariska Tunjung (f)
 Doubles:  (Mahiro Kaneko & Yunosuke Kubota) (m) /  (Baek Ha-na & Lee Yu-rim) (f)
 Mixed:  (Rinov Rivaldy & Pitha Haningtyas Mentari)

Continental badminton events
 February 13 – 15: 2017 Oceania Senior and Junior Badminton Championships in / Nouméa
 Senior
 Singles winners:  Pit Seng Low (m) /  Wendy Chen Hsuan-yu (f)
 Doubles winners:  Matthew Chau & Sawan Serasinghe (m) /  Setyana Mapasa & Gronya Somerville (f)
 Mixed winners:  Sawan Serasinghe & Setyana Mapasa
 Junior
 Junior Singles winners:  Oscar Guo (m) /  Sally Fu (f)
 Junior Doubles winners:  Oscar Guo & Dacmen Vong (m) /  Sally Fu & Tamara Otene (f)
 Mixed Junior winners:  Edward Lau & Christine Zhang
 February 14 – 19: 2017 Badminton Asia Mixed Team Championships in  Ho Chi Minh City
 Champions: ; Second: ; 3/4 Placements:  & 
 February 15 – 19: 2017 European Mixed Team Badminton Championships in  Lubin
 Champions: ; Second: ; 3/4 Placements:  & 
 February 16 – 18: 2017 Oceania Junior Mixed Team Badminton Championships in / Nouméa
 Champions: ; Second: ; Third: 
 February 16 – 19: 2017 Pan Am Mixed Team Badminton Championships in  Santo Domingo
 April 7 – 16: 2017 European Junior and Junior Team Badminton Championships in  Mulhouse
 Junior Singles winners:  Toma Junior Popov (m) /  Julie Dawall Jakobsen (f)
 Junior Doubles winners:  (Thom Gicquel & Toma Junior Popov) (m) /  (Emma Karlsson & Johanna Magnusson) (f)
 Junior Mixed winners:  (Rodion Alimov & Alina Davletova)
 Junior Team winners: 
 April 17 – 23: 2017 All Africa Mixed Team and Individual Badminton Championships in  Benoni & Johannesburg
 Singles winners:  Adel Hamek (m) /  Kate Foo Kune (f)
 Doubles winners:  (Koceila Mammeri & Youcef Sabri Medel) (m) /  (Michelle Butler-Emmett & Jennifer Fry) (f)
 Mixed Doubles winners:  (Andries Malan & Jennifer Fry)
 Mixed Team winners: 
 April 25 – 30: 2017 Badminton Asia Championships in  Wuhan
 Singles winners:  Chen Long (m) /  Tai Tzu-ying (f)
 Doubles winners:  (Li Junhui & Liu Yuchen) (m) /  (Misaki Matsutomo & Ayaka Takahashi) (f)
 Mixed Doubles winners:  (Lu Kai & Huang Yaqiong)
 April 25 – 30: 2017 European Badminton Championships in  Kolding
 Singles winners:  Rajiv Ouseph (m) /  Carolina Marín (f)
 Doubles winners:  (Mathias Boe & Carsten Mogensen) (m) /  (Kamilla Rytter Juhl & Christinna Pedersen) (f)
 Mixed Doubles winners:  (Chris Adcock & Gabby Adcock)
 April 27 – 30: 2017 Pan Am Badminton Championships in  Havana
 Singles winners:  Ygor Coelho de Oliveira (m) /  Rachel Honderich (f)
 Doubles winners:  (Jason Ho-shue & Nyl Yakura) (m) /  (Michelle Tong & Josephine Wu) (f)
 Mixed Doubles winners:  (Toby Ng & Rachel Honderich)
 July 22 – 30: 2017 Badminton Asia Team & Individual Junior Championships in  Jakarta
 Singles winners:  LEUNG Jun Hao (m) /  HAN Yue (f)
 Doubles winners:  (DI Zijian & WANG Chang) (m) /  (BAEK Ha-na & LEE Yu-rim) (f)
 Mixed Doubles winners:  (Rehan Naufal Kusharjanto & Siti Fadia Silva Ramadhanti)
 Team -> Champions: ; Second: ; Third/Fourth:  & 
 July 25 – 28: 2017 Pan American Junior Badminton Championships in  Markham, Ontario
 Singles winners:  Brian Yang (m) /  Lauren Lam (f)
 Doubles winners:  (Fabricio Farias & Waleson Vinicios Evangelista dos Santos) (m) /  (Breanna Chi & Cindy Yuan) (f)
 Mixed Doubles winners:  (Brian Yang & Katie Ho-Shue)

2017 BWF Super Series
 March 7 – December 17: 2017 BWF Super Series Schedule
 March 7 – 12: 2017 All England Super Series Premier in  Birmingham
 Singles:  Lee Chong Wei (m) /  Tai Tzu-ying (f)
 Doubles:  (Marcus Fernaldi Gideon & Kevin Sanjaya Sukamuljo) (m) /  (Chang Ye-na & Lee So-hee) (f)
 Mixed:  (Lu Kai & Huang Yaqiong)
 March 28 – April 2: 2017 India Super Series in  New Delhi
 Singles:  Viktor Axelsen (m) /  P. V. Sindhu (f)
 Doubles:  (Marcus Fernaldi Gideon & Kevin Sanjaya Sukamuljo) (m) /  (Shiho Tanaka & Koharu Yonemoto) (f) 
 Mixed:  (Lu Kai & Huang Yaqiong)
 April 4 – 9: 2017 Malaysia Super Series Premier in  Kuala Lumpur
 Singles:  Lin Dan (m) /  Tai Tzu-ying (f)
 Doubles:  (Marcus Fernaldi Gideon & Kevin Sanjaya Sukamuljo) (m) /  (Yuki Fukushima & Sayaka Hirota) (f)
 Mixed:  (Zheng Siwei & Chen Qingchen)
 April 11 – 16: 2017 Singapore Super Series in 
 Singles:  B. Sai Praneeth (m) /  Tai Tzu-ying (f)
 Doubles:  (Mathias Boe & Carsten Mogensen) (m) /  (Kamilla Rytter Juhl & Christinna Pedersen) (f)
 Mixed:  (Lu Kai & Huang Yaqiong)
 June 13 – 18: 2017 Indonesia Super Series Premier in  Jakarta
 Singles:  Srikanth Kidambi (m) /  Sayaka Sato (f)
 Doubles:  (Li Junhui & Liu Yuchen) (m) /  (Jia Yifan & Chen Qingchen) (f)
 Mixed:  (Tontowi Ahmad & Liliyana Natsir)
 June 20 – 25: 2017 Australian Super Series in  Sydney
 Singles:  Srikanth Kidambi (m) /  Nozomi Okuhara (f)
 Doubles:  (Takeshi Kamura & Keigo Sonoda) (m) /  (Misaki Matsutomo & Ayaka Takahashi) (f)
 Mixed:  (Zheng Siwei & Chen Qingchen)
 September 12 – 17: 2017 Korea Open Super Series in  Seoul
 Singles:  Anthony Sinisuka Ginting (m) /  P. V. Sindhu (f)
 Doubles:  (Mathias Boe & Carsten Mogensen) (m) /  (Huang Yaqiong & Yu Xiaohan) (f)
 Mixed:  (Praveen Jordan & Debby Susanto)
 September 19 – 24: 2017 Japan Open Superseries in  Tokyo
 Singles:  Viktor Axelsen (m) /  Carolina Marín (f)
 Doubles:  (Marcus Fernaldi Gideon & Kevin Sanjaya Sukamuljo) (m) /  (Misaki Matsutomo & Ayaka Takahashi) (f)
 Mixed:  (Wang Yilu & Huang Dongping)
 October 17 – 22: 2017 Denmark Super Series Premier in  Odense
 Singles:  Srikanth Kidambi (m) /  Ratchanok Intanon (f)
 Doubles:  (Liu Cheng & Zhang Nan) (m) /  (Lee So-hee & Shin Seung-chan) (f)
 Mixed:  (Tang Chun Man & Tse Ying Suet)
 October 24 – 29: 2017 French Open Superseries in  Paris
 Singles:  Srikanth Kidambi (m) /  Tai Tzu-ying (f)
 Doubles:  (Lee Jhe-huei & Lee Yang) (m) /  (Greysia Polii & Apriyani Rahayu) (f) 
 Mixed:  (Tontowi Ahmad & Liliyana Natsir)
 November 14 – 19: 2017 China Open Superseries Premier in  Fuzhou
 Singles:  Chen Long (m) /  Akane Yamaguchi (f)
 Doubles:  (Marcus Fernaldi Gideon & Kevin Sanjaya Sukamuljo) (m) /  (Chen Qingchen & Jia Yifan) (f)
 Mixed:  (Zheng Siwei & Huang Yaqiong)
 November 21 – 26: 2017 Hong Kong Open Superseries in  Kowloon
 Singles:  Lee Chong Wei (m) /  Tai Tzu-ying (f)
 Doubles:  (Marcus Fernaldi Gideon & Kevin Sanjaya Sukamuljo) (m) /  (Chen Qingchen & Jia Yifan) (f)
 Mixed:  (Zheng Siwei & Huang Yaqiong)
 December 13 – 17: 2017 BWF Super Series Finals in  Dubai
 Singles:  Viktor Axelsen (m) /  Akane Yamaguchi (f)
 Doubles:  Marcus Fernaldi Gideon & Kevin Sanjaya Sukamuljo) (m) /  (Shiho Tanaka & Koharu Yonemoto) (f)
 Mixed:  (Zheng Siwei & Chen Qingchen)

2017 BWF Grand Prix Gold and Grand Prix
 January 17 – December 10: 2017 BWF Grand Prix Gold and Grand Prix Schedules
 January 17 – 22: 2017 Malaysia Masters Grand Prix Gold in  Kuala Lumpur
 Singles:  Angus Ng (m) /  Saina Nehwal (f)
 Doubles:  (Berry Angriawan & Hardianto) (m) /  (Jongkolphan Kititharakul & Rawinda Prajongjai) (f)
 Mixed:  (Tan Kian Meng & Lai Pei Jing)
 January 24 – 29: 2017 Syed Modi International Grand Prix Gold in  Lucknow
 Singles:  Sameer Verma (m) /  P. V. Sindhu (f)
 Doubles:  (Mathias Boe & Carsten Mogensen) (m) /  (Kamilla Rytter Juhl & Christinna Pedersen) (f)
 Mixed:  (Pranav Chopra & N. Sikki Reddy)
 February 7 – 12: 2017 Thailand Masters Grand Prix Gold in  Bangkok
 Singles:  Tommy Sugiarto (m) /  Busanan Ongbumrungpan (f)
 Doubles:  (Huang Kaixiang & Wang Yilu) (m) /  (Chen Qingchen & Jia Yifan) (f)
 Mixed:  (Zhang Nan & Li Yinhui)
 February 28 – March 5: 2017 German Open Grand Prix Gold in  Mülheim
 Singles:  Chou Tien-chen (m) /  Akane Yamaguchi (f)
 Doubles:  (Kim Astrup & Anders Skaarup Rasmussen) (m) /  (Yuki Fukushima & Sayaka Hirota) (f)
 Mixed:  (Zhang Nan & Li Yinhui)
 March 14 – 19: 2017 Swiss Open Grand Prix Gold in  Basel
 Singles:  Lin Dan (m) /  Chen Xiaoxin (f)
 Doubles:  (Chai Biao & Hong Wei) (m) /  (Chen Qingchen & Jia Yifan) (f)
 Mixed:  (Dechapol Puavaranukroh & Sapsiree Taerattanachai)
 April 18 – 23: 2017 China Masters Grand Prix Gold in  Jiangsu
 Singles:  Tian Houwei (m) /  Aya Ohori (f)
 Doubles:  (Chen Hung-ling & Wang Chi-lin) (m) /  (Bao Yixin & Yu Xiaohan) (f)
 Mixed:  (Wang Yilu & Huang Dongping)
 May 30 – June 4: 2017 Thailand Open Grand Prix Gold in  Bangkok
 Singles:  B. Sai Praneeth (m) /  Ratchanok Intanon (f)
 Doubles:  (Berry Angriawan & Hardianto) (m) /  (Greysia Polii & Apriani Rahayu) (f)
 Mixed:  (He Jiting  & Du Yue)
 June 27 – July 2: 2017 Chinese Taipei Open Grand Prix Gold in  Taipei
 Singles:  Chou Tien-chen (m) /  Saena Kawakami (f)
 Doubles:  (Chen Hung-ling & Wang Chi-lin) (m) /  (Chae Yoo-jung & Kim So-yeong) (f)
 Mixed:  (Seo Seung-jae & Kim Ha-na)
 July 11 – 16: 2017 Canada Open Grand Prix in  Calgary
 Singles:  Kanta Tsuneyama (m) /  Saena Kawakami (f)
 Doubles:  (Peter Briggs & Tom Wolfenden) (m) /  (Mayu Matsumoto & Wakana Nagahara) (f)
 Mixed:  (Kim Won-ho & Shin Seung-chan)
 July 18 – 23: 2017 Russia Open Grand Prix in  Vladivostok
 Singles:  Sergey Sirant (m) /  Evgeniya Kosetskaya (f)
 Doubles:  (Vladimir Ivanov & Ivan Sozonov) (m) /  (Akane Araki & Aoi Matsuda) (f)
 Mixed:  (Chan Peng Soon & Cheah Yee See)
 July 19 – 23: 2017 U.S. Open Grand Prix Gold in  Anaheim, California
 Singles:  Prannoy Kumar (m) /  Aya Ohori (f)
 Doubles:  (Takuto Inoue & Yuki Kaneko) (m) /  (Lee So-hee & Shin Seung-chan) (f)
 Mixed:  (Seo Seung-jae & Kim Ha-na)
 September 4 – 10: 2017 Vietnam Open Grand Prix in  Ho Chi Minh City
 Singles:  Khosit Phetpradab (m) /  Sayaka Takahashi (f)
 Doubles:  (Wahyu Nayaka & Ade Yusuf) (m) /  (Chayanit Chaladchalam & Phataimas Muenwong) (f)
 Mixed:  (Alfian Eko Prasetya & Melati Daeva Oktavianti)
 October 10 – 15: 2017 Dutch Open Grand Prix in  Almere
 Singles:  Kento Momota (m) /  Zhang Beiwen (f)
 Doubles:  (Liao Min-chun & Su Cheng-heng) (m) /  (Della Destiara Haris & Rizki Amelia Pradipta) (f)
 Mixed:  (Marcus Ellis& Lauren Smith)
 October 31 – November 5: 2017 Bitburger Open Grand Prix Gold in  Saarbrücken
 Singles:  Rasmus Gemke (m) /  Nichaon Jindapon (f)
 Doubles:  (Kim Astrup & Anders Skaarup Rasmussen) (m) /  (Jongkolphan Kititharakul & Rawinda Prajongjai) (f)
 Mixed:  (Anders Skaarup Rasmussen & Line Kjærsfeldt)
 November 22 – 26: 2017 Scottish Open Grand Prix in  Glasgow
 Singles:  Toby Penty (m) /  Kirsty Gilmour (f)
 Doubles:  (Jelle Maas & Robin Tabeling) (m) /  (Selena Piek & Cheryl Seinen) (f)
 Mixed:  (Jacco Arends & Selena Piek)
 November 28 – December 3: 2017 Korea Masters Grand Prix Gold (final) in  Seoul
 Singles:  Jeon Hyeok-jin (m) /  Gao Fangjie (f)
 Doubles:  (Kim Won-ho & Seo Seung-jae) (m) /  (Lee So-hee & Shin Seung-chan) (f)
 Mixed:  (Seo Seung-jae & Kim Ha-na)
 December 5 – 10: 2017 Indonesian Masters Grand Prix Gold in  Jakarta
 Event cancelled.

References

External links
 Badminton World Federation

 
Badminton by year